"Caliente" is a 2013 Spanish language dance hit single by Jay Santos released on the Spanish Blanco y Negro Music record label. It was released on 26 February 2013 becoming the first solo charting hit of Jay santos, after his 2012 success as a featured artist on Spanish DJ and producer Jose de Rico and Spanish-Dominican singer Henry Mendez European hit "Noche de estrellas". Lyrics:
La fiesta esta buena es pa beber pa bailar...
Si tu estas soltera a mi gustaria probar

Track listing
"Caliente" (Radio Edit) (3:22)
"Caliente" (Extended Version) (5:26)
"Caliente" (Acapella) (3:22)

Charts

Weekly charts

Year-end charts

References

2012 singles
Spanish-language songs
2012 songs
Blanco y Negro Records singles